Puri bhaji (sometimes spelled poori bhaji) is a dish, originating from the Indian subcontinent, of puri (deep-fried rounds of flour) and aloo (potato) bhaji (a spiced potato dish which may be dry or curried). It is a traditional breakfast dish in North India.

Many Indian households prefer puri bhaji and other traditional dishes over cereals for breakfast. Some serve it for lunch along with condiments such as dahi (yogurt) and salad. In central India, puri bhaji is served as a street snack. Puri bhaji is a vegetarian dish and is popular in India because it is relatively inexpensive and tasty. The dish is also served on railway platforms in India and is served as a packed lunch on trains along with pickle. Puri bhaji can also be served with Lapsi.

References

Indian snack foods
Pakistani snack foods
Uttar Pradeshi cuisine